Prolongoa is a genus of Spanish plants in the chamomile tribe within the daisy family.

Species
The only accepted species is Prolongoa hispanica, native to Spain.

References

External links
Flickr, Prolongoa hispanica G. López & C. E. Jarvis  photo
Roca y Flor, Camino del Pueyo. Prolongoa hispanica in Spanish; photos plus informal description
Flores Silvestres del Mediterráneo, Prolongoa hispanica 

Monotypic Asteraceae genera
Anthemideae
Taxa named by Pierre Edmond Boissier